Max Penzel (born April 1977) is a German cinematographer and director. Based in Germany and Singapore but operating internationally, Penzel has worked as first and second unit cinematographer on feature films including Cloud Atlas (2012), Hitman: Agent 47 (2015), Global Player (2014), Strajk (2006), Berlin Calling (2008), and the mini-series Crews & Gangs (2019).

Education 
Penzel studied at the German Film und Television Academy (dffb) in Berlin from 1999 to 2005 and received a scholarship to attend the National Film School in Lodz, Poland, whose alumni include three Oscar-winners: Roman Polanski, Andrzej Wajda and Zbigniew Rybczyńsk, as well as several other Academy Award, BAFTA and Palme d’Or winners and nominees in the director and cinematographer categories such as Piotr Sobociński and Sławomir Idziak.

Through his education and work, Penzel counts amongst his mentors esteemed German filmmaker Volker Schlöndorff, director of the Oscar and Palme d’Or winning film The Tin Drum (1979), German cinematographer Michael Ballhaus, A.S.C., who collaborated with directors such as Rainer Werner Fassbinder, Martin Scorsese and James L. Brooks, and Polish cinematographer Sławomir Idziak, who was nominated for a BAFTA and an Academy Award for his work on Ridley Scott’s Black Hawk Down (2001).

Recognition 
While studying at and since graduating from the German Film and Television Academy (dffd), Penzel’s work began gaining worldwide recognition and accolades. Penzel was the cinematographer on director Andreas Samland’s short Tag 26 (2002) which won Best Short at the Brooklyn International Film Festival, Grand Prix at the International Fantasy Film Festival and Best German Short at the International Film Festival Ludwigsburg.

In 2004, Penzel was awarded the Michael Ballhaus Film Prize and in 2007 won Best Cinematography (2nd unit) at the Bavarian Film Awards for his supporting work on Volker Schlöndorff’s Strajk (2006), a docudrama about the Polish solidarity movement in the 1970s and 80s.

Style 
Through his work as a multi-disciplinary director and cinematographer in cinema commercials and music videos, Penzel has developed a unique style known for its immersive nature.

Penzel has worked on projects in a variety of size and scope, from television mini-series to big budget major motion pictures, and is comfortable in all formats, including CinemaScope.

Penzel used a hand-held style in Berlin Calling (2008), a film that became a Berlin cult film and remained in cinemas for over ten years. In the immersive 2010 documentary on Paul Kalkbrenner, Penzel chose a style designed to give viewers the feeling of being a part of the concert crowd.

For his work on the mini-series Crews & Gangs (2019), Penzel collaborated with camera rental company ARRI Rental Berlin to change the DNA of a ZEISS lens in order to produce the Berlin street look and feel he felt the series needed.

Work 
Penzel founded two companies: m-quadrat GmbH & Co KG in Germany and m-quadrat ASIA Pte Ltd in Singapore, that specialize in cinematography, creative services, VFX supervision, and visual concepts.

Awards 
 Bavarian Film Award for Best Cinematography (2nd unit) (2007)
 Michael Ballhaus Film Prize (2004)
 Best Short Film for Der Blindgänger - Brooklyn International Film Festival (2004)
 Best Short Film for Tag 26 - Brooklyn International Film Festival (2003)

Filmography
Cinematography 1st Unit

 Crews and Gangs
 Old Kakis Cine 65
 Paul Kalkbrenner 2010 – A Live Documentary (2010)
 Lights
 Mystery Challenge
 Anomalia (2008)
 ART 3 Ladys First
 ART 7 The Teacher
 Live Behind the Wall
 The Date (2004)
 Gou Gou's Autumn
 Der Blindgänger (English: The Dud) (2004)
 Menschenkörper (English: Human Body) (2004)
 Tag 26 (English: Day 26) (2002)

Cinematography 2nd Unit

 Agent 47
 Global Player
 Cloud Atlas, a 2012 film based on the 2004 novel
 Aazaan
  (2009)
 Berlin Calling (2008)
  (2008)
 Cobra 11
 Beautiful Bitch (2006)
 Strajk – Die Heldin von Danzig

Selected Music Videos 
Udo Lindenberg Hinterm Horizont (2010)
Moderat Rusty Nails BPitch Control (2008)

Official Website 
Official Website

External links

 
 (paulkalkbrenner.net)
 (Crew United Profile)

Film Links and Websites 
Berlin Calling Official Website (German)
:de:Berlin Calling (Berlin Calling - German Wikipedia article)
 (Ampelmann (German) - IMDb)
 (Lights (English) - IMDb)
Fleisch ist mein Gemüse Official Website (German)
:de:Fleisch ist mein Gemüse (Fleisch ist mein Gemüse - German Wikipedia article)
Whisky mit Wodka Official Website (German)
Beautiful Bitch Official Website
:de:Beautiful Bitch (Beautiful Bitch - German Wikipedia article)
The Ninth Day web site
 (Menschenkörper - IMDb)

References 

1977 births
Living people
German cinematographers
German documentary film directors